"Paranoid" is the first single by American pop band Jonas Brothers from their fourth studio album, Lines, Vines and Trying Times. It was released on May 12, 2009, by Hollywood Records. The three brothers wrote the song with English singer Cathy Dennis and their record producer John Fields.

Background and composition

The song made its debut on Radio Disney on May 7, 2009, and proceeded to be released on Facebook during a live webcast. It was released on iTunes on May 12, 2009. It was subsequently released to mainstream radio on May 18, 2009.

Music video
The music video was directed by Brendan Malloy and Tim Wheeler, who also directed the video for the group's song "Burnin' Up". The video premiered on May 23, 2009 on the Disney Channel.

The music video opens with Joe, Nick and Kevin sitting in three chairs in an empty warehouse, where they turn to each other but each brother switches seats suddenly. Then it shows scenes of all the brothers on their own. Kevin is in a room full of his clones, Joe goes up a ladder in a hotel hallway and finds himself in a wrestling ring and Nick opens a door in the hotel and is lost in a desert where his car comes and he starts driving. Once he is crossing the desert, he notices a girl in a car beside him, pointing him back on the road. Nick suddenly runs into a door, and he awakens from a dream. Joe and Kevin ask Nick if he's okay then notice two wrestlers and the girl in his car, who seem to have suddenly appeared, with numerous Kevin clones running towards them. This is all shown with scenes of the brothers playing in the warehouse from the opening. The music video was released on iTunes on May 26, 2009, and can now be found on YouTube. The video was filmed on May 3–5, 2009.

Track listing
US and Europe CD single
 "Paranoid"
 "Pushin' Me Away" (from The 3D Concert Experience)

Commercial performance

The song debuted on the Billboard Hot 100 at number 37.

Charts

Weekly charts

Monthly charts

Release history

References

2009 singles
Jonas Brothers songs
Songs written by Cathy Dennis
Songs written by Kevin Jonas
Songs written by Joe Jonas
Songs written by Nick Jonas
Hollywood Records singles
2009 songs
Song recordings produced by John Fields (record producer)
Songs written by John Fields (record producer)